Lebanon is a city in and the county seat of Lebanon County, Pennsylvania, United States. The population was 26,814 at the 2020 census. 

Lebanon was founded by George Steitz in 1740 and was originally named Steitztown.

History

Native tribes in the area of what is now Lebanon included the Shawnee, Susquehannock, Gawanese, Lenape (or Delaware), and Nanticoke peoples.

Lebanon was settled by European colonists in 1720, many with the family names of "Steitz" and "Light", along a creek that was then named "Steitz Creek". The Light patriarchs built a fort to protect against Indians and named it "Light's Fort". The town was laid out in 1753, incorporated as a borough on February 20, 1821, and became a city on November 25, 1885. It adopted the commission form of government, consisting of four councilmen and a mayor.

Lebanon bologna was first made here, since before the 1780s. The Union Canal, which operated from 1828 to 1885, flowed through the city's north side. San Giorgio pasta has been manufactured in Lebanon since 1914, and was acquired by nearby Hershey Foods Corporation in 1966. Lebanon was formerly home to a major steel mill operated by Bethlehem Steel.

Geography

Lebanon is bordered to its north and east by North Lebanon Township (4.5 mi), to its south and east by South Lebanon Township (3.22 mi), to its west by West Lebanon Township (1.07 mi), and to its south and west by North Cornwall Township (4.38 mi). The Quittapahilla Creek drains the city westward into the Susquehanna River via the Swatara Creek.

Climate
Average monthly temperatures in center city Lebanon range from 29.4 °F in January to 74.3 °F in July. The city and vicinity have a hot-summer humid continental climate (Dfa) and the local hardiness zone is 6b.

Demographics

As of the 2020 census, the city was 60.8% White, 5.4% Black or African American, 0.1% Native American, 1.3% Asian, and 5.6% were two or more races. 43.8% of the population were of Hispanic of Latino ancestry .

As of the census of 2000, there were 24,461 people, 10,266 households, and 6,056 families residing in the city. The population density was 5,844.8 people per square mile (2,254.0/km). There were 11,220 housing units at an average density of 2,681.0 per square mile (1,033.9/km). The racial makeup of the city was 85.50% White, 3.23% African American, 0.28% Native American, 1.02% Asian, 0.10% Pacific Islander, 8.11% from other races, and 1.76% from two or more races. Hispanic or Latino of any race were 16.43% of the population.

There were 10,266 households, out of which 28.4% had children under the age of 18 living with them, 38.7% were married couples living together, 15.0% had a female householder with no husband present, and 41.0% were non-families. 35.4% of all households were made up of individuals, and 15.3% had someone living alone who was 65 years of age or older. The average household size was 2.32 and the average family size was 3.00.

In the city, the population was spread out, with 25.0% under the age of 18, 8.4% from 18 to 24, 29.5% from 25 to 44, 20.5% from 45 to 64, and 16.6% who were 65 years of age or older. The median age was 36 years. For every 100 females, there were 94.1 males. For every 100 females age 18 and over, there were 90.8 males.

The median income for a household in the city was $27,259, and the median income for a family was $34,045. Males had a median income of $26,957 versus $20,162 for females. The per capita income for the city was $15,584. About 12.8% of families and 16.2% of the population were below the poverty line, including 24.7% of those under age 18 and 10.5% of those age 65 or over.

Education
Public education is provided by the Lebanon School District and Cornwall-Lebanon School District. Private institutions include Blue Mountain Christian School, New Covenant Christian School and Lebanon Christian Academy. All three private institutions have a varsity sports department and an elementary, junior high, and senior high. Students in Lebanon School District also may attend the Lebanon County Career and Technology Center. The city is home to Harrisburg Area Community College's Lebanon Campus.

Culture

Lebanon, Pennsylvania is thought to be named after the ancient Middle Eastern nation of Lebanon, however, this wasn't confirmed. Locals consistently pronounce the Pennsylvania city's name  ("Leb-a-nin") and many shorten it to two syllables—"Leb-nin" or even "Lep-nin." The latter is particularly identified with Pennsylvania Dutch heritage.

An infamous 1878 murder in Fort Indiantown Gap resulted in a trial of six defendants who all had blue eyes. They were given the moniker the Blue-eyed Six by a newspaper reporter who attended the trial, held in the Lebanon county courthouse. Five of the six defendants were hanged at the county jail. The trial received worldwide publicity and provided inspiration to Arthur Conan Doyle in writing the Sherlock Holmes short story "The Red-Headed League" (1891).

At one point in history the Lebanon County courthouse and jail became the home of the popular Lebanon Farmers Market. However, the market returned to the original 30,000 square foot Market House on North 8th street in 2003.

Lebanon is one of several Pennsylvania towns to drop or raise a unique item at midnight on New Year's Eve. Godshall's Quality Meats, owners of Weaver's Famous Lebanon Bologna, donates a  Lebanon bologna for the annual festivity. It is encased in a metal frame and suspended from a fire department ladder truck, and donated to a local rescue mission after the celebration.

In December 2008, the TV show Dirty Jobs, hosted by Mike Rowe, visited the Seltzer's Smokehouse Meats to film production of Lebanon bologna.  In 2008 the show featured the Wertz Candy Shop.

In 2010, an independent film drama Lebanon, PA was made. While the movie was set in Lebanon, all filming was done in other parts of Pennsylvania.

Points of interest

Local points of interest listed on the National Register of Historic Places include:
Chestnut Street Log House
Cornwall & Lebanon Railroad Station
Josiah Funck Mansion
Reading Railroad Station
Salem Evangelical Lutheran Church
St. Lukes Episcopal Church
Tabor Reformed Church
Union Canal Tunnel Park
Lebanon Farmers Market
Lebanon County Historical Society

Notable people
 Thomas Albert, composer
 Jaynne Bittner (née Jaynne Berrier), pitcher All-American Girls Professional Baseball League
 Sam Bowie, NBA center
 James Buchanan, 15th President of the United States, and first member of the Lebanon County Bar Association
 Matt Busch, illustrator and professor at Macomb Community College
 Robert Coleman (industrialist), iron barron and politician
 Kerry Collins, former NFL quarterback
 Jamie Lynn Corkish, sport shooter and gold medalist at the 2012 Summer Olympics
 David Edgerton, co-founder of Burger King
 Derek Fisher, outfielder for the Toronto Blue Jays
 Jacob G. Francis, founder of Elizabethtown College
 Bobby Gerhart, NASCAR/ARCA driver
 Betty Harte, silent-film actress
 Randal Kleiser, American film director, producer and screenwriter
 Todd Klick, American writer 
 Jared Odrick, NFL defensive end for the Miami Dolphins and Jacksonville Jaguars
 Frank Reich, former NFL quarterback and head coach of the Indianapolis Colts
 George S. Rentz, World War II Navy Cross recipient and United States Navy Chaplain
 Dick Shiner, former NFL quarterback
 Michael Wavves, rapper

References

External links

 
 Lebanon Valley Chamber of Commerce
 

 
County seats in Pennsylvania
Populated places established in 1756
Cities in Lebanon County, Pennsylvania
1756 establishments in Pennsylvania
Cities in Pennsylvania